PIAPTK Recordings is an American independent record label founded in Olympia, Washington in 2006 by Michael Dixon and  based in Tucson, Arizona.

History
Michael Dixon started People in a Position to Know (PIAPTK) Recordings in 2006 while teaching high school in Olympia.  Inspired by New Zealand's lathe pioneer Peter King, Dixon acquired a disc cutting lathe and began cutting and releasing hand-made DIY records.  In 2013, Dixon put his teaching career on hold and moved to Tucson to make records full time, through his five vinyl companies: PIAPTK, Soiled Gold, Lathecuts.com, Mobile Vinyl Recorders, and The Science of Sound.

Artists

Catalog

References

External links
 People In A Position To Know & Solid Gold Recordings homepage
 

American independent record labels
Experimental music record labels